Thalles may refer to:

 Thallyson (footballer, born 1991), full name Thallyson Augusto Tavares Dias, Brazilian football left-back
 Thallyson (footballer, born 1996), full name Thallyson Gabriel Lobo Seabra, Brazilian football midfielder

See also
 Thalisson (born 1998), full name Thalisson Kelven da Silva, Brazilian football centre-back